Cláudia Cicero dos Santos Sabino (born 4 August 1977) is a Brazilian adaptive rower who competes in international elite events. She is a World champion and has competed at the Paralympic Games three times.

Santos has her right leg amputated at the hip due to a car accident in 2000.

References

1977 births
Living people
Paralympic rowers of Brazil
Rowers at the 2008 Summer Paralympics
Rowers at the 2012 Summer Paralympics
Rowers at the 2016 Summer Paralympics
Rowers at the 2020 Summer Paralympics
People from Barueri